Celia Gámez Carrasco (August 25, 1905 – December 10, 1992) was an Argentinian film actress, and one of the icons of the Golden Age of Spanish theatre. She was more commonly known in Franco's Spain, particularly in her later years, as La Protegida.

Biography
She was born in Buenos Aires, Argentina, but there is some dispute regarding her date of birth, since there is no documentary record of it. Just as there is no copy of her birth certificate available, there is no copy of a death certificate.  There is a large (but not unanimous) consensus that she died on her 87th birthday.   She was said to have been a lover of a great number of famous men, among them José Millán Astray and King Alfonso XIII.

Family
Her father was of Spanish descent and she was proud of her ancestry.  Educated in a convent, arrived in Spain from Argentina to pursue professional opportunities. She remained there permanently from 1926. At first, she was a famous singer of tangos and schottisches.

She married once in 1944 to José Manuel Goenaga, but never had children.

Career
Celia Gámez was discovered by businessman Salvador Videgain in Argentina acting with Gloria Guzmán. Videgain hers presented with Las Castigadoras in 1927 in theatre Romea the most popular in Madrid. who would give him the opportunity of starring Las lloronas 1928. The titles was gone Por si las moscas 1929, Las cariñosas 1930, Las pantorrillas, Gran clipper. In 1940 she starred in famous titles of revue and increased her popularity with such songs as El Pichi and Por la calle de Alcalá (1931, from Las Leandras) and La Devoradora (1932); the latter making the actress the vamp of Spanish theatre in the 1940s. She created her company with famous names and unknowns but famous in the future of theatre Tony Leblanc, Concha Velasco, Florinda Chico, Lina Morgan and Esperanza Roy.
 
The titles famous was gone La cenicienta del palace, Yola, Si Fausto fuera Faustina, Rumbo a pique, Fin de semana, Hoy como ayer, Gran revista, La estrella de Egipto, Dólares, La hechicera en palacio, El águila de fuego, Su Excelencia la embajadora, La estrella trae cola 1960 and Mami llévame al colegio with Ángel de Andrés, 1964 version of Las Leandras.

Filmography
Gámez refused to work in Hollywood since she did not speak English and she did not want to perform small roles. She starred in El sargento Lápida (1937), El diablo con faldas (1938), and Rápteme usted (1940), among other films. She worked in Spain in Las Leandras (1968) alternating with stars like Juanito Navarro, and others, where she sang the song "Por la calle de Alcalá". Other songs were "Canciones de nuestra vida" (1971) and in 1974 "Mi hijo no". In later years, her albums were inspired by the songs of revue genre musicals in Spain.

In music, art and fashion
Francisco Alonso wrote many songs for her, among them "Por la calle de Alcalá". It has been recorded by many singers including Plácido Domingo. Other songwriters also composed songs for her.
The House of Peris designed extravagant creations just for her.

Songs
 "Si vas a París papá"
 "El Pichi"
 "¡Viva Madrid!"
 "Mírame"
 "Horchatera valenciana"
 "Los nardos (Por la calle de Alcalá)"
 "La Lola"
 "Un millón"
 "El beso"
 "Estudiantina portuguesa"

References

External links
CELIA GAMEZ -CANCIÓN ESPAÑOLA - El Arte de Vivir el Flamenco

1905 births
1992 deaths
Argentine film actresses
Cupletistas
Burials at La Chacarita Cemetery
20th-century Argentine actresses
20th-century Spanish singers
People with Alzheimer's disease